Cherwell is a rural locality in the Fraser Coast Region, Queensland, Australia.

Geography
The Isis River forms the northern boundary, while the Cherwell River flows through from the south-west to form part of the eastern boundary before joining the Isis.

Road infrastructure
The Bruce Highway runs through from south-east to south-west.

References 

Fraser Coast Region
Localities in Queensland